Burdur Şiş, which is popular in and around Burdur, Turkey, is a type of kebab or köfte dish in Turkish cuisine. It is made differently than şiş köfte, as it doesn't contain any spice or herbs except salt and it is always eaten with special type of pide. Burdur Şiş obtained geographical indication from Turkish Patent and Trademark Office in 2010.

History 
Although it was made with minced goat meat in the early 19th century, it is now made with minced fat beef due to decreased goat raising and changing natural sociocultural system in years.

See also 

 Şiş Köfte
 Kebab
 Şiş Kebap
 List of Kebabs
 Turkish Cuisine

References 

Burdur Province
Turkish cuisine